Krysta Palmer (born June 13, 1992) is a diver from the United States.

College career
Palmer competed for the University of Nevada, Reno where she was named the school's top female student-athlete in 2015–16.

International career
Palmer qualified for the 2020 Olympics in the women's synchronized 3 meter springboard with partner Alison Gibson by virtue of winning the U.S. Olympic Trials in part due to the high degree of difficulty of their dives. She won bronze in women's individual 3 meter springboard at the 2020 Olympics.

Personal life
Palmer is the daughter of Mitch and Vicki Palmer. She has one sibling named Devin. Palmer is a Christian.

References

American female divers
Living people
Nevada Wolf Pack women's divers
Nevada Wolf Pack coaches
University of Nevada, Reno alumni
World Aquatics Championships medalists in diving
1992 births
Divers at the 2020 Summer Olympics
Olympic divers of the United States
Olympic bronze medalists for the United States in diving
Medalists at the 2020 Summer Olympics
College diving coaches in the United States